Colonel Ruby Bradley (December 19, 1907 – May 28, 2002) was a United States Army Nurse Corps officer, a prisoner of the Japanese in World War II, and one of the most decorated women in the United States military. She was a native of Spencer, West Virginia but lived in Falls Church, Virginia, for over 50 years.

Military career
Bradley entered the United States Army Nurse Corps as a surgical nurse in 1934. She was serving at Camp John Hay in the Philippines when she was captured by the Japanese army three weeks after the attack on Pearl Harbor on December 7, 1941.

In 1943, Bradley was moved to the Santo Tomas Internment Camp in Manila. It was there that she and several other imprisoned nurses earned the title "Angels in Fatigues" from fellow captives. For the next several months, she provided medical help to the prisoners and sought to feed starving children by shoving food into her pockets whenever she could, often going hungry herself. As she lost weight, she used the room in her uniform for smuggling surgical equipment into the prisoner-of-war camp. At the camp she assisted in 230 operations and helped to deliver 13 children.

When United States troops captured the camp on February 3, 1945, Bradley weighed only . She was then returned to the United States where she continued her career in the army. She received a Bachelor of Science degree from the University of California in 1949.

Bradley served in the Korean War as Chief Nurse for the 171st Evacuation Hospital. In November 1950, during the Chinese counter-offensive, she refused to leave until she had loaded the sick and wounded onto a plane in Pyongyang while surrounded by 100,000 advancing Chinese soldiers. She was able to jump aboard the plane just as her ambulance exploded from an enemy shell. In 1951, she was named Chief Nurse for the Eighth Army, where she supervised over 500 Army nurses throughout Korea.

Bradley was promoted to the rank of colonel in 1958 and retired from the army in 1963.

Later life
Bradley was the subject of a February 23, 2000 NBC Nightly News report by Tom Brokaw about the forgotten heroes of the military.

After her death in 2002 Bradley was also the recipient of a memorial resolution, drafted by Congressman Joe Baca of California, regarding her exemplary service to this nation.

Awards
Bradley's military record included 19 separate decorations, medals and ribbons. These included:
Legion of Merit with oak leaf cluster
Bronze Star Medal with oak leaf cluster
Army Commendation Medal with oak leaf cluster
Prisoner of War Medal
Presidential Unit Citation with oak leaf cluster
Meritorious Unit Commendation
American Defense Service Medal with "Foreign Service" clasp
American Campaign Medal
Asiatic-Pacific Campaign Medal with two campaign stars
World War II Victory Medal
Army of Occupation Medal with "Japan" clasp
National Defense Service Medal with star
Korean Service Medal with three campaign stars
Philippine Defense Medal (Republic of Philippines) with star
Philippine Liberation Medal (Republic of Philippines) with star
Philippine Independence Medal (Republic of Philippines)
United Nations Service Medal
Korean War Service Medal (Republic of Korea)
Florence Nightingale Medal (International Red Cross)

Dates of rank
2nd Lieutenant (relative rank) – 16 October 1934
1st Lieutenant (AUS) – 18 February 1945
Captain (AUS) – 27 October 1945
Captain (RA) – 19 August 1947 (to rank from 19 December 1942)
Major (RA) – 15 May 1950
Lieutenant Colonel (RA) – 23 July 1952
Colonel (RA) – 4 March 1958

References

External links

1907 births
2002 deaths
World War II prisoners of war held by Japan
United States Army personnel of the Korean War
United States Army officers
Burials at Arlington National Cemetery
Recipients of the Legion of Merit
American prisoners of war in World War II
United States Army Nurse Corps officers
Female United States Army nurses in World War II
Women in warfare post-1945
Women in war in East Asia
People from Spencer, West Virginia
People from Falls Church, Virginia
Florence Nightingale Medal recipients
Nurses from Virginia
Nurses from West Virginia